Cape independence (Afrikaans: Kaapse Onafhanklikheid; isiXhosa: Inkululeko yaseKapa), also known by the portmanteau CapeXit, is the political movement to make the Western Cape province, and often other regions of the Eastern and Northern Cape provinces, an independent state from the rest of South Africa.

The Western Cape province is unique amongst the other provinces in South Africa in that there is no majority racial group, being the most diverse sub-national region in Southern Africa. Just under half of Western Cape inhabitants speak Afrikaans as a first language, with sizeable minorities speaking isiXhosa and English as their first languages. A plurality of the Cape's inhabitants are 'Coloured', a diverse group of people with varying ancestry from Africa, Europe, and Southeast Asia.

Formation of the Union of South Africa 

In the late 19th century there were four colonies and independent states in what is now South Africa – the British Cape Colony, Natal and the two Boer Republics – Orange Free State and South African Republic. There were numerous attempts to unify these separate entities due to fears of external (non-British) European powers potentially interfering. Numerous proposals were put forward from a highly centralised unitary state to a more loose decentralised federation as proposed by powerful cape politician Saul Solomon. Ultimately these endeavours failed, and war broke out between the British Empire and the Boer Republics following the discovery of gold in the South African Republic.

Following the British victory in the war, the South Africa Act 1909 was passed by the British parliament and the newly conquered republics alongside the Cape Colony and Natal were unified into one centralised, unitary state – the Union of South Africa. This was unlike the formation of Canada and Australia which were created as federations.

Degradation of non-racialism in the Cape 

The former Cape Colony was unique in that the franchise to vote was not determined by skin colour, but on residential, economical and educational requirements, in stark contrast to the other states in the region. During the negotiations for the creation of the Union, the Cape's last Prime Minister, John X. Merriman, fought unsuccessfully to have this multi-racial franchise system extended to the rest of South Africa. The attempt failed in the face of opposition from the white governments of the other constituent states, which were determined to entrench white rule.

The final version of the South Africa Act permitted the Cape Province to keep a newly restricted version of its traditional franchise, where qualification for suffrage was limited to education and wealth. This led to the Cape being the only province in South Africa where coloureds and black Africans could vote. However, the act also permitted the Parliament of South Africa to prescribe all other voting qualifications and it could override the Cape's franchise with a two-thirds majority.

Initially, the right to this franchise was upheld, but with the substantial support for segregation based policies from the incorporated northern regions, these rights were gradually reduced via acts of parliament. This had a significant effect on the support for more liberal politics, such as the United Party, which drew large support from coloured people in the Cape. As a result, in 1948 the National Party won the national elections while campaigning on the platform of apartheid, being enable to draw on conservative white voters in the more densely populated north.

Apartheid years 
In the subsequent apartheid years, the people of the Cape Province continued with their liberal traditions. In 1951, whilst in opposition to the National Party led government's move to finally strike all coloureds off the voters roll, the torch commando (a militia of former white and non-white ex military personnel) led many large scale protests in the Cape against those policies, with torch lit marches in Cape Town that drew up to 75,000 protesters. Within parliament, opposition towards apartheid was led under the leadership of the Progressive Party, where the majority of their support was drawn from the Cape Province.

As negotiations to end apartheid began, renewed calls to form a decentralised federal state came from the Democratic Party (successor to the Progressive Party), Freedom Front, and others.  In the end, however, through their CODESA accords, the National Party (NP) and African National Congress (ANC) agreed upon a partially-devolved unitary state instead.

Post Apartheid 
With the fall of Apartheid and the implementation of a new constitution, the Cape Province and other provinces were divided into new provinces: The Western Cape, Eastern Cape, Northern Cape and a portion of the North West. During the 1994 election, the Western Cape was one of the only provinces who didn't vote for the ANC, instead opting to vote for the now reformed and non-racial New National Party. Throughout the following years, the ANC never managed to attain an outright majority in the Western Cape, only forming a provincial government once from 2004 to 2009 during a period of strong economic growth. However, with declining growth and increasing political scandals such as the Arms Deal and HIV denialism, the Western Cape voted for the Democratic Alliance in 2009 who have been in office ever since.

Growth 
The modern Cape Independence movement started in 2007, when the Cape Party was founded off a Facebook group, based on the growing disillusionment with the national government's continued use of race-based policies and declining economic growth. The movement gained little traction until the latter half of the 2010s, when – after years of persistent government corruption, the inability of the DA to significantly grow outside of the Cape, slowed economic growth, and increasingly racialised rhetoric by all political parties, including advocates of Cape Independence – other organisations such as CapeXit, Gatvol Capetonian and the Sovereign State of Good Hope were formed.

With the onset of the COVID-19 pandemic and further disillusionment with the national government failing to reform despite a new leader, the movement began to gain momentum. That same year, the Cape Independence Advocacy Group (a political pressure group) was formed followed by polling on the issue to be conducted. Later that year, the Freedom Front Plus, one of South Africa's minority political parties, came out in support of Cape independence.

With the persistence of the pandemic alongside large scale social unrest, where over 300 people died in the east and the north of the country in 2021, the movement continued to grow on this trajectory.

Legal position

Calling of a referendum 
Section 127 of the South African Constitution gives provisions for the Premiers to call for referendums in their own province. However, this is not currently legally possible. The Democratic Alliance has introduced a bill in 2021 to align the law with the constitution. In addition, section 37(f) of the constitution of the Western Cape also gives provisions for Premiers to call for referendums. Proponents of secession hence argue that it is a possibility to hold a referendum on Cape Independence within the Western cape. However, since the Constitution of South Africa supersedes any provincial constitution and does not explicitly grant the right to secession or such referendums, it is unclear what standing a provincial referendum will have on this matter.

Right to self-determination 
Section 235 of the Constitution of South Africa states:
 The right of the South African people as a whole to self-determination, as manifested in this Constitution, does not preclude, within the framework of this right, recognition of the notion of the right of self-determination of any community sharing a common cultural and language heritage, within a territorial entity in the Republic or in any other way, determined by national legislation. However, the qualifier of this right states that any such self-determination would occur "within a territorial entity in the Republic or in any other way, determined by national legislation". Section 235 does not explicitly grant the right to secede from South Africa. Enclaves such as Orania or the various African kingdoms within South Africa, while maintaining this right to self-determination, remain bound by the South African Constitution and legislation.

In addition, the South African Constitution makes it clear that both the Bill of Rights, and the Constitution itself, must consider International Law.

Section 39(1)(b) states:When interpreting the Bill of Rights, a court, tribunal or forum (b) must consider international law;Section 233 states:When interpreting any legislation, every court must prefer any reasonable interpretation of the legislation that is consistent with international law over any alternative interpretation that is inconsistent with international lawSince 1994, South Africa has ratified three international covenants which guarantee the right of self-determination to all peoples.

On 9 July 1996 South Africa ratified the African Charter on Human and Peoples’ Rights (ACHPR) which, in Article 20, states that all peoples have the right to exist, that their right to self-determination is unquestionable and inalienable, and that they can freely pursue their economic and social development according to the policy they have freely chosen.

On 10 December 1998 South Africa ratified the International Covenant on Civil and Political Rights (ICCPR) which, in Article 1, states that all peoples have the right to self-determination, and by virtue of that right they can freely determine their political status and freely pursue their economic, social, and cultural development.

On 12 January 2015 South Africa ratified the International Covenant on Economic, Social, and Cultural Rights (ICESCR) which, in Article 1, again states that all peoples have the right to self-determination, and by virtue of that right they can freely determine their political status and freely pursue their economic, social, and cultural development;

The right to self-determination has been proposed as a route for creating a legal framework wherein the Cape could secede from South Africa.

However, under international law, secession is seen as an 'extreme' measure reserved for remedial means (i.e. for former colonies) or when a population suffers 'extreme prejudice'. While there is ongoing debate on the matter, it is generally accepted that self-determination is not synonymous with secession, nor does the former lead to the latter in the majority of cases. Further, despite the references to international law in the South African Constitution and Bill of Rights, international law does not contain an explicit right or legal framework for secession.

Opinion polling and support

Support 
Empirical data shows that Cape Independence has gathered a substantial amount of support amongst residents of the Western Cape. CapeXit, an NGO gathering signed mandates in support of independence has garnered over 820,000 signatures of registered Western Cape voters. The legitimacy of this figure is however disputed, but the organisation states that it has implemented mechanisms to verify that the identity numbers are indeed legitimate. This figure is far below the 2021 polling results, which show that 46% (or 1.39 million) of registered Western Cape voters do support independence.

Opinion polling 
Two opinion polls have been completed to date, both conducted by Victory Research, a polling company whose clientele includes the Democratic Alliance, Uber, British American Tobacco, First Rand and KPMG. When interpreting these results, it is important to note that these surveys were conducted via mobile phone. 

Note: Values don't add up to 100% on the account of those not expressing an opinion.

Arguments used by proponents 
Proponents of Cape Independence advocate for the secession of the Cape from South Africa along numerous lines:

Cultural 
The Cape region is demographically distinct from the rest of the country: with the first language of most inhabitants being Afrikaans, the region being much more ethnically diverse and with the largest ethnic group being Coloureds. This blend of groups and culture has given the Cape a unique cultural heritage such as the Kaapse Klopse minstrel parades or Cape Malay cuisine.

Economic 
Proponents of independence argue that an independent Cape would fare much better economically. Currently only the Western Cape and Gauteng provinces are net contributors to the state's fiscus, with the Western Cape only getting back 45% of tax money collected in the province. Proponents also argue that the current economic policies of South Africa are stifling growth and development, and that an independent Cape, with its more economically liberal ideology, would hence be better off.

Ideological 
The Western Cape is the only province in the country never to have voted for the ruling ANC in a majority. It is also the only province that has a provincial government not controlled by that party. The greater Cape region traditionally draws substantial support for the DA, with the more liberal party drawing strong support from Coloureds, and more generally from people with English or Afrikaans as a first language. Proponents argue that the Cape gets an unfair deal being subjected to policies and an ideology that it routinely rejects at the ballot box; this grievance is especially highlighted in the 2019 elections where parties that advocate for BEE and land reform, the ANC and EFF, jointly attained their largest ever share of the vote, at 73.1%, in the other eight provinces of South Africa in stark contrast to the Western Cape.

Non-racialism 
Some proponents of independence claim that the race-based laws implemented by the national government unfairly discriminates against most inhabitants of the Western Cape. Coloured leaders such as Fadiel Adams state that under the current Broad-Based Economic laws, coloured people are unfairly discriminated against with national demographic quotas (nine percent) being imposed on a region where coloureds make up the majority. Proponents campaign on making an independent Cape non-racial where race based laws are outlawed.

Stability 
There is wide spread consensus by inhabitants of the Western Cape that South Africa is going backwards; there is also wide spread fear that the situation in South Africa will get worse, especially since the riots in the east and the north of the country in July 2021. People of the Western Cape believe that their home province is better governed than the rest of the country – a sympathy shared with a number of other South Africans more broadly. Supporters of Cape Independence hence argue that an independent Cape would thus be better run, and be able to provide stability to her people.

Criticism

Accusations of racism 

The largest accusations levelled against the Cape Independence movement includes accusations of racism. Some critics allege that the movement is an attempt to create a white ethnonationalist state and seeking to reimplement the former apartheid system. The movement firmly denies these accusations, asserting that they are explicitly calling for a new non-racial country and that their support is drawn from all racial groups, with white people in particular only making 27% of all Cape Independence supporters. Polling in July 2021 found that 64% of white people, 50% of 'coloured' people, and 22% of black people supported Cape Independence.

In April 2022, the Cape Independence Advocacy Group (CIAG) was accused of racism for a pictograph which depicted the rest of South Africa as black and the Western Cape as shades of brown, black, and white. This was displayed alongside two other images with the imagery of the USSR and ANC over South Africa, with only the Western Cape showing the Ukrainian and Democratic Alliance colours under the heading "We're Just Different".

Legality arguments 
Critics argue that a constitutional amendment would be required, as Section 235 of the South African Constitution, while formally and officially establishing "the right of self-determination of any community sharing a common cultural and language heritage", does not place a legal obligation for the National Assembly to respect this right to self determination; and hence, that a referendum would be non-binding; nor does it provide a framework for a territory of the Republic to secede. Furthermore, critics argue that advocating is tantamount to sedition – however, some state that secession is a political matter.

Spectre of civil war 
It is claimed by other opponents of the Cape Independence movement that even if a successful referendum were to be held, the national government would never recognise the outcome and would commission the military to control the region, thus leading to a possible civil war.

On the other hand, proponents say that a civil war would be highly improbable considering that: even during apartheid, civil war didn't break out, the national government has been decidedly mute on the entire issue, that South Africa is not in the financial position to wage such a large scale conflict and that the movement is entirely peaceful in nature.

Involved organisations 
Below a table is presented with some of the organisations involved in the Cape Independence movement.

See also 
 Cape Colony
 Cape Independence Party
 Cape Qualified Franchise
 Secession
 Self-determination

References

External links 
Links to major Cape Independence organisation's webpages:
 Cape Independence Advocacy Group
 CapeXit
 Cape Independence Party

Independence movements
Liberalism in South Africa
Political movements in South Africa
Politics of Africa
Separatism in South Africa
Western Cape